Westminster is a city and borough in Inner London. It is the site of the United Kingdom's Houses of Parliament and much of the British government. It occupies a large area of central Greater London, including most of the West End. Many London landmarks are within the borough, including Buckingham Palace, Westminster Abbey, Whitehall, Westminster Cathedral, 10 Downing Street, and Trafalgar Square.

Westminster became a city in 1540, and historically, it was a part of the ceremonial county of Middlesex. Its southern boundary is the River Thames. To the City of Westminster's east is the City of London and to its west is the Royal Borough of Kensington and Chelsea. To its north is the London Borough of Camden.  

The borough is divided into a number of localities including the ancient political district of Westminster; the shopping areas around Oxford Street, Regent Street, Piccadilly and Bond Street; and the night-time entertainment district of Soho. Much of the borough is residential, and in 2019 it was estimated to have a population of 261,000. Despite large swaths of parks and open spaces, including Hyde Park and most of Regent's Park, the population density of the district is high.

The London Westminster borough was created with the 1965 establishment of Greater London. Upon the creation, it inherited the city status previously held by the then Metropolitan Borough of Westminster from 1900, which was first awarded to Westminster in 1540. The local government body is Westminster City Council, and there has been a Lord Mayor of the City of Westminster since 1966, while the area is also within authority of the Mayor of London, an office created in 2000.

Coat of arms

The current Westminster coat of arms was given to the city by an official grant on 2 September 1964.

Westminster had other arms before, which had a chief identical to the chief in the present arms. The symbols in the lower two thirds of the shield stand for former municipalities now merged with the city, Paddington and St Marylebone. The original arms had a portcullis as the main charge, which now forms the crest.

History
After the depopulation of Roman London in the 5th century, an Anglo Saxon agricultural and trade settlement likely developed to its west, associated with the Middle Saxons, sometimes called Lundenwic ('London village' or London port').  Over time, Lundenburh ('London fort'), the former Roman city with its still-existing Roman walls, was repopulated and Lundenwic declined, becoming pastoral and partly known as Aldwych (Aldwic - 'old village'), the name of which lives on for a section of Westminster.

The origins of the City of Westminster pre-date the Norman Conquest of England. In the mid-11th century, King Edward the Confessor began the construction of an abbey at Westminster, only the foundations of which survive today. Between the abbey and the river he built a palace, thereby guaranteeing that the seat of Government would be fixed at Westminster, and inevitably drawing power and wealth west out of the old City of London.

For centuries Westminster and the City of London were geographically quite distinct. It was not until the sixteenth century that houses began to be built over the adjoining fields, eventually absorbing nearby villages such as Marylebone and Kensington, and gradually creating the vast Greater London that exists today.

Henry VIII's dissolution of the monasteries abolished the abbey at Westminster, although the former abbey church is still called Westminster Abbey. The church was briefly the cathedral of the Diocese of Westminster created from part of the Diocese of London in 1540, by letters patent which also granted city status to Westminster, a status retained after the diocese was abolished in 1550. The Westminster Court of Burgesses was formed in 1585 to govern the Westminster area, previously under the Abbey's control. The City and Liberties of Westminster were further defined by Letters Patent in 1604, and the court of burgesses and liberty continued in existence until 1900, and the creation of the Metropolitan Borough of Westminster.

The present-day City of Westminster as an administrative entity with its present boundaries dates from 1965, when the City of Westminster was created from the former area of three metropolitan boroughs: St Marylebone, Paddington, and the smaller Metropolitan Borough of Westminster, which included Soho, Mayfair, St James's, Strand, Westminster, Pimlico, Belgravia, and Hyde Park. This restructuring took place under the London Government Act 1963, which significantly reduced the number of local government districts in London, resulting in local authorities responsible for larger geographical areas and greater populations.

The Westminster Metropolitan Borough was itself the result of an administrative amalgamation which took place in 1900. Sir John Hunt O.B.E was the First Town Clerk of the City of Westminster, 1900–1928.

In addition to the City and Liberty of Westminster, prior to 1900, the area occupied by what would become the Metropolitan Borough of Westminster had been administered by five separate local bodies: the Vestry of St George Hanover Square, the Vestry of St Martin in the Fields, Strand District Board of Works, Westminster District Board of Works and the Vestry of Westminster St James.

The boundaries of the City of Westminster today, as well as those of the other London boroughs, have remained more or less unchanged since the Act of 1963.

Demographics

Ethnicity

The following table shows the ethnic group of respondents in the 1991 to 2021 censuses in Westminster.

Religion

Housing
The borough ranks highest on one standard criteria in analysing housing supply and demand, the proportion of private rented accommodation relative to other types of housing in England.

Income inequality
A study in 2017 by Trust for London and The New Policy Institute found that Westminster has the third-highest pay inequality of the 32 London boroughs. It also has the second-least affordable private rent for low earners in London, behind only Kensington and Chelsea.

Education
In education, 82% of adults and 69% of 19-year-olds having Level 3 qualifications.

Governance

Local government

The city is divided into 18 wards, each electing three councillors. As of 2022, Westminster City Council is currently composed of 31 Labour Party councillors and 23 Conservative Party councillors.

A lord mayor is elected annually to serve as the official representative of the city for one year. See List of mayors of Westminster for a list of former mayors (1900–1965) and lord mayors (1965 to date).

UK Parliament

Districts

The City of Westminster covers all or part of the following areas of London:

 "Albertopolis" (shared with the Royal Borough of Kensington and Chelsea)
 Bayswater
 Belgravia (shared with the Royal Borough of Kensington and Chelsea)
 Covent Garden (shared with the London Borough of Camden)
 Fitzrovia (shared with the London Borough of Camden)
 Hyde Park
 Knightsbridge (shared with the Royal Borough of Kensington and Chelsea)
 Lisson Grove
 Maida Vale
 Mayfair
 Marylebone
 Millbank
 Paddington
 Pimlico
 St James's
 St John's Wood
 Soho, including Chinatown
 "Theatreland"
 Victoria
 Westbourne Green (shared with the Royal Borough of Kensington and Chelsea)
 West End (shared with the London Borough of Camden)
 Westminster City Centre

Economy
Many global corporations have their global or European headquarters in the City of Westminster. Mayfair and St James's within the City of Westminster also have a large concentration of hedge fund and private equity funds. The West End is known as the Theatre District and is home to many of the leading performing arts businesses. Soho and its adjoining areas house a concentration of media and creative companies. Oxford Street is a busy shopping destination.

Landmarks

The City of Westminster contains some of the most famous sites in London, including Buckingham Palace, Westminster Abbey,  the Palace of Westminster (Houses of Parliament) and Big Ben.

Parks and open spaces

These include Green Park, Hyde Park, Kensington Gardens, Regent's Park and St James's Park. In addition to parks and open spaces within the borough, the City owns and maintains East Finchley Cemetery and crematorium in the London Borough of Barnet.

Transport

National Rail stations
Four National Rail stations serve the City of Westminster:

London Underground
The City of Westminster is served by 27 London Underground stations and 10 of the 11 lines.

Electric charging points
By 2009 Westminster City Council had electric vehicle charging points in 15 locations through the city (13 car parks and two on-street points). Users pay an annual fee to cover administration costs to register and use the points. By 2018 there were 60 electric vehicle charging locations.

Travel to work
In March 2011, the main forms of transport that residents used to travel to work were: underground, metro, light rail, tram, 21.0% of all residents aged 16–74; on foot, 9.3%; bus, minibus or coach, 9.3%; driving a car or van, 6.0%; work mainly at or from home, 5.5%; bicycle, 3.1%; train, 3.0%.

Education

Westminster Children's Services administers many primary and secondary schools. In addition, there are several state-funded faith schools, primarily Church of England (CE), and Roman Catholic (RC), but Christian non-denominational (ND) schools are also in the borough, and there are several non-profit-making junior and senior independent schools.

Universities and colleges
The University of Westminster has its three campuses in the borough; 309 Regent Street (with 4–12 / 16 Little Titchfield Street and 32 / 38 Wells Street buildings uniting under the same campus), 115 New Cavendish Street, and 29 / 35 Marylebone Road.
The Strand campus of King's College London is located within the district.
The London Business School, in Regent's Park.
The London School of Economics, at Clare Market, near Aldwych.
The Royal Academy of Music, on Marylebone Road.
University of the Arts London has constituent colleges in Millbank (Chelsea College of Art and Design) and Oxford Street (London College of Fashion).
The Courtauld Institute of Art, in Somerset House, Strand.
Brigham Young University London Centre, on Palace Court.
The northern half of Imperial College London's main South Kensington campus lies within the borough.
City of Westminster College is a further education college with campuses on Paddington Green and at Queens Park. It also owns the Cockpit Theatre, which is used as a training and performance venue.
Regent's College, whose campus is within the grounds of Regent's Park, which houses: European Business School London; Regent's American College London; Regent's Business School; School of Psychotherapy and Counselling; Webster Graduate School; Internexus, a provider of English language courses.
Westminster Kingsway College is a further education college with centres in Soho and Victoria in Westminster. It also has centres in Camden.
The Royal College of Art in Kensington Gore.

Public libraries

The London Library, an independent lending library, is at 14 St James Square.

The city operates two reference libraries; Westminster Reference Library and Marylebone Information Service. Westminster Reference Library holds several special collections: of which the Sherlock Holmes, Arts and Business collections are the most comprehensive. In addition to the collections in Westminster Reference Library the city has two specialist libraries: the Westminster Music Library, the largest music library in the UK and the Westminster Chinese Library in the Charing Cross Library.

Free City of Westminster operated public lending libraries in Westminster include:
 Charing Cross Library
 Church Street Library
 The Maida Vale Library
 Marylebone Library
 Mayfair Library
 Paddington Library
 Pimlico Library
 Queen's Park Library
 St. John's Wood Library
 Victoria Library

Embassies and High Commissions 
Many countries' embassies or High Commissions are in Westminster.

Notable people

Freedom of the City
The following people and military units have received the Freedom of the City of Westminster.

Individuals
 Rt Hon. Sir Winston Churchill: 1946.
 Sir Robert Mark: 22 June 1977.
 Rt Hon. Margaret Thatcher: 12 December 1990.

Military units
 HMS Westminster, RN: 11 December 2005.

See also

 History of local government in London
 History of London
 List of churches in the City of Westminster
 River Westbourne
 Tri-borough shared services
 Westminster St Margaret and St John

Notes

References
Gray, Robert, A History of London, Hutchinson & Co, London, 1978,

External links

 City of Westminster
 Westminster, by Sir Walter Besant and Geraldine Edith Mitton and A. Murray Smith, 1902, from Project Gutenberg
 Westminster City Council YouTube channel
 West End Extra: A local newspaper covering the City of Westminster

 
London boroughs
Local authorities adjoining the River Thames
Cities in London
1965 establishments in the United Kingdom